Erçek Cave is a show cave located in Zonguldak, northern Turkey.

References

Show caves in Turkey
Caves of Zonguldak Province
Tourist attractions in Zonguldak Province